Kentriko (Village of Kentriko - Municipal Unit of Andania), belongs to the municipality of Ichalia of the Regional Unit of Messenia located in the Region of Peloponnese, according to the administrative division of Greece as formed by the Kallikratis Plan 2011 local government reform program. 
The official village name is "Kentrikon". 
The seat of the municipality is Meligalas and it belongs to the geographical division of Peloponnese. During the administrative division of Greece with the "Kapodistrias" plan, until 2010, Kentriko belonged to the Local District of Kentriko, of the former Andania Municipality of Messenia Prefecture.

Kentriko has an altitude of 80 meters above sea level, at latitude 37.2756097633 and longitude 21.969310287.

Kentriko today is surrounded by arable land and its approximately 100 inhabitants are engaged exclusively in agricultural work. It is located 38 kilometers from the Messenia capital Kalamata, 35 kilometers from Kyparissia and only 6 kilometers from Meligalas.

History
Kentriko is a small village built in the center of a plain, hence its name, near Polichni and Diavolitsi. Its oldest name until 1927 was Kato Kurtaga or simply Kurtaga. The name change is due to a decision of the then government to rename all the settlements that had Turkish-speaking names. According to the prevailing version, the name Kurtaga was taken from a Turkish official, namely Aga, with the name Kurt, who probably owned the area during the Turkish occupation.
The village existed before the revolution of 1821.
Kentriko at the beginning of the 20th century was a hub because initially the Meligalas - Kentriko railway section had not been built. So passengers from Kalamata had to stop at Meligala and board horse-drawn wagons to go to Kentriko and pick up another train that started from there to Tripoli.

Climate
Kentriko has a mediterranean climate (Köppen Csa) with mild, wet winters and dry, hot summers. It receives plenty of precipitation days in winter. Summers are very hot and dry.

Cuisine

Local specialities:

Kalamata olives
Lalagides local donuts
Pasto salted pork
Lokaniko with orange
Petimezi
Diples (dessert)
Sfela goat cheese

Notable people
 Michail A Karageorgis, 1899-1995, Shipowner
 George Anastasopoulos 1965-, Engineer

References 

Villages in Greece